Dermot Bailey (born 18 February 1994) is a British professional wheelchair tennis player. He was a semifinalist in the 2019 Queen's Club Championships – Wheelchair Singles and a quarterfinalist in the 2021 Queen's Club Championships – Wheelchair Singles.

He competed in wheelchair tennis at the 2020 Summer Paralympics.

Life 
Bailey was diagnosed with Legg–Calvé–Perthes disease and took up wheelchair tennis aged 8. He worked as a financial analyst at Kettering General Hospital but left to focus on tennis.

References

External links
 
 
 

1994 births
Living people
British male tennis players
British wheelchair tennis players
English disabled sportspeople
English male tennis players
Paralympic medalists in wheelchair tennis
Paralympic wheelchair tennis players of Great Britain
Wheelchair category Paralympic competitors
Wheelchair tennis players at the 2020 Summer Paralympics